Nuclear receptor coactivator 7 is a protein that in humans is encoded by the NCOA7 gene.

See also
 Transcription coregulator

References

External links

Further reading

External links
 

Gene expression
Transcription coregulators
Human proteins